The Bournemouth Raiders was an American football club based in Bournemouth, England. The club folded in May 2006.

Early days

The club was created in 1988 at Bournemouth School for Boys through a group of gridiron football enthusiasts. Starting by playing and learning the game during lunch breaks, the players created a team called the Bournemouth Deckchairs, and in the fall of 1988 played back to back games against the local under-15 team, the Bournemouth Bearcats.

Colours

The team played in black and grey uniforms, the same colours as their namesakes the Las Vegas Raiders.

League record

All-Time Results

Tables

1990 Table

1991 Table

2001 Table

2002 9man Table

2002 5man Table

2003 Table

References

The Complete List of Britball Teams 
1990 official tables 
1991 official tables 

American football teams in England
1988 establishments in England
2006 disestablishments in England
American football teams established in 1988
American football teams disestablished in 2006
Viking Age in popular culture